Darling Downs Zoo is a zoo situated in Pilton, Queensland, Australia. The zoo is divided into four separate geographical areas featuring animals mostly from Africa, South America, South-East Asia and Australia.

History 
The zoo was closed from 27 March to 9 June 2020 due to government restrictions during the COVID-19 pandemic in Australia. As the zoo had large carnivores it had problems feeding them. It relied on bank loans and generous people to cover costs, and also set up a crowdfunding page to raise money. The zoo has since re-opened to the public.

Species

Species at the zoo from different regions (continent alphabetical below) include:

Africa

 Addax
 African lion (including white-coated)
 Aldabra giant tortoise
 Black-and-white ruffed lemur
 Cape porcupine
 Caracal
 Cheetah
 Common ostrich
 Dromedary camel
 Dumeril's boa
 Giraffe
 Grant's zebra
 Grey parrot
 Hamadryas baboon
 Meerkat
 Pygmy hippopotamus
 Radiated tortoise
 Ring-tailed lemur
 Serval

Americas

 American alligator
 Blue-and-yellow macaw
 Boa constrictor
 Bolivian squirrel monkey
 Brazilian agouti
 Capybara
 Common marmoset
 Cotton-top tamarin
 Emperor tamarin
 Golden lion tamarin
 Guanaco
 Llama
 Maned wolf
 Patagonian mara
 Pygmy marmoset
 Red-and-green macaw
 Red-handed tamarin
 Rhinoceros iguana
 Scarlet macaw
 Tufted capuchin
 Turquoise-fronted parrot
 Yellow anaconda
 Yellow-crowned amazon

Asia

 Blackbuck
 Burmese python
 Golden pheasant
 Indian star tortoise
 Javan binturong
 Komodo dragon
 Mandarin duck
 Nicobar pigeon
 Pied stilt
 Red-whiskered bulbul
 Rhesus macaque
 Siamang
 Sri Lankan leopard
 Sumatran tiger

Australia

 Australian barn owl
 Australian brush-turkey
 Australian bustard
 Australian grass owl
 Australian king parrot
 Australian pelican
 Banded lapwing
 Bare-nosed wombat
 Black swan
 Budgerigar
 Bush stone-curlew
 Cape Barren goose
 Central bearded dragon
 Chestnut rail
 Cockatiel
 Common ringtail possum
 Diamond dove
 Dingo
 Eastern bearded dragon
 Eastern blue-tongued lizard
 Eclectus parrot
 Emu
 Freshwater crocodile
 Galah
 Gang-gang cockatoo
 Koala
 Laughing kookaburra
 Malleefowl
 Nankeen kestrel
 Nankeen night heron
 Noisy pitta
 Perentie
 Quokka
 Red kangaroo
 Red-legged pademelon
 Red-tailed black cockatoo
 Red-winged parrot
 Regent bowerbird
 Rose-crowned fruit dove
 Royal spoonbill
 Rufous bettong
 Saltwater crocodile
 Satin bowerbird
 Shingleback lizard
 Sulphur-crested cockatoo
 Tawny frogmouth
 Yellow-tailed black cockatoo

Europe
 Red deer

Photos

References

External links

 Country Zoo. Landline, Woodward, Jenny (29 October 2016). Australian Broadcasting Corporation. Retrieved 30 January 2021.

Darling Downs
Zoos in Queensland
Tourist attractions in Queensland